The Lee Yan Lian building is a high-rise building in the Kawasan Perancangan Pusat borough of Kuala Lumpur, Malaysia. The building has 18 stories and is 73.04 m (240 ft) tall.  Until the construction of the Malaysian Houses of Parliament in 1959, it was the tallest building in Malaysia. It was completed in 1945

See also
 List of tallest buildings in Kuala Lumpur
 List of tallest buildings in Malaysia

References

Office buildings in Kuala Lumpur
Buildings and structures completed in 1945
20th-century architecture in Malaysia